Suchismita Maurya is an Indian politician and a member of 17th Legislative Assembly of Majhawan, Uttar Pradesh of India. She represents the Majhawan constituency of Uttar Pradesh. She is a member of the Bharatiya Janata Party.

Political career
Maurya has been a member of the 17th Legislative Assembly of Uttar Pradesh. Since 2017, she has represented the Milak constituency and is a member of the BJP.

Posts held

See also
Uttar Pradesh Legislative Assembly

References

Uttar Pradesh MLAs 2017–2022
Bharatiya Janata Party politicians from Uttar Pradesh
Living people
People from Mirzapur district
Year of birth missing (living people)